Alexandre de Villeneuve (25 May 1677, Hyères – 1756) was an 18th-century French classical composer.

A priest in Hyères, he was received in 1697 as a chorister in Saint-Trophime d'Arles and became master of Music in 1701. He remained in this office until 1706 and then went to Paris. In 1719 he published a book of sacred music dedicated to Madame d'Orléans.

See also

External links 
 La Princesse d'Elide on Gallica

French classical composers
French male classical composers
People from Hyères
1677 births
1756 deaths